Streptomyces pseudogriseolus is a bacterium species from the genus of Streptomyces which has been isolated from soil. Streptomyces pseudogriseolus produces xanthomycin, deseryladenomycin and physostigmine.

See also 
 List of Streptomyces species

References

Further reading

External links
Type strain of Streptomyces pseudogriseolus at BacDive -  the Bacterial Diversity Metadatabase

pseudogriseolus
Bacteria described in 1955